MWQ or mwq may refer to:

 MWQ, the IATA code for Magway Airport, Myanmar
 MWQ, the station code for Motari Halt railway station, Odisha, India
 mwq, the ISO 639-3 code for Kʼchò language, Burma